Nazareno Andrea De Angelis or Nanni (Campotosto, 31 July 1958 – Rome; 5 October 1980) was an Italian militant and politician and a leader of Terza Posizione.

Biography 
Nanni De Angelis was born in Campotosto, Abruzzo, the region of origin of the family. His grandfather was the opera singer Nazzareno De Angelis. Since his childhood, he attended the school of scouts and religious school in Rome, where he began to take an interest in politics. In 1972, at the age of fourteen, he proposed to the councilor for the cultural heritage of Rome, Raniero Benedetto, the creation of a volunteer corps of boys (the scouts to which he belongs), who would replace the guards during the summer. museums on leave, proposal not realized for trade union reasons.

His brother, former militant of Terza Posizione, was senator of the National Alliance, then of Popolo della liberta. Journalist, he was director of Il Secolo d'Italia.

Lotta Studentesca 

In 1976, with Gabriele Adinolfi, Roberto Fiore and Walter Spedicato, he founded Lotta Studentesca, composed of young students who tried to detach themselves from any neo-fascist or far-right experience. The term "student struggle" did not last long, giving way more and more to the new symbol of the "Third position" (Terza Posizione).

In 1977, he changed schools and moved to Azzarita, near Bologna where he befriended Eugenio Pomarici, the Roman leader of the Republican youth. During this period, he became friends with Massimiliano Taddeini and Luigi Ciavardini.

In the autumn of 1978, while walking with a friend along the Corso Trieste in Rome, at the intersection of Via Spalato, De Angelis was attacked by a group of communist militants suffering stab wounds including a stroke. carried in the back which pierces the lung. The attackers quickly disappear and lose a Tolfa leather bag that the investigators examine, finding inside documents revealing that among the attackers is left-wing activist Valerio Verbano.

In 1979, Lotta Studentesca was officially dissolved by his activists who gave birth to the new organization "Terza Posizione", structured in cells of 3-4 militants and divided into areas of competence. De Angelis became military director of the Africa-Trieste district, leading a team called I Brutti by his opponents. De Angelis' team took part in violent clashes, sometimes with knives, with far-left activists.

On 22 February 1980 Valerio Verbano was murdered in Rome. A few days later, De Angelis is called to the phone by Verbano's father convinced that the death of his son was due to revenge. De Angelis met Verbano's father talking together for about an hour and broke up on good terms.

On 28 May police officer Francesco Evangelista called Serpico was killed by a group of Nuclei Armati Rivoluzionari.

Following the Bologna massacre of 2 August, on 23 September, arrest warrants were issued against many TP members, including Nanni De Angelis and his brother Marcello. About five hundred agents are employed to arrest wanted persons and to search for members of the organization. On 3 October 1980 they went to an appointment with Carlo Sette to obtain false documents and financial support, but they were arrested on the Barberini Square by the police. At the time of his arrest, De Angelis was reportedly severely beaten on the head by police officers. Senator of the Italian Social Movement Michele Marchio, in a question to the Senate addressed to Deputy Secretary Angelo Sanza, reported that De Angelis was reportedly "beaten up" inside the police station.

Death 

On the morning of 5 October 1980, Nanni De Angelis was admitted to the hospital where the doctors drew up a medical report which, although showing no fracture or injury, provided for a seven-day stoppage, but was released on same morning and returned by ambulance to Rebibbia Prison. The same day he was found hanged in his cell.

The version of the police immediately published in the newspapers spoke of suicide. An investigation followed, recorded in the autopsy report ordered by the magistrate. In this report, signed by Professor Silvio Merli, contrary to what was stated by the prison doctors, there are many bruises all over the body and especially on the head. De Angelis' family has never accepted the hypothesis of the son's suicide.

On 30 September 1981, Marco Pizzari, suspected of having "betrayed" Ciavardini and De Angelis for informing the police of the place where they had an appointment with Carlo Sette, was killed by the NAR with three shots. It seems that Pizzari had not betrayed but that his phone had been intercepted by the police.

In culture
Songs dedicated to Nanni de Angelis:
 Hyperborea - Piccolo Atilla
 270bis - Nanni e partito (song written by Nanni's brother Marcelo De Angelis)

In Spain
 Mara Ros - No olvido

References 

Politicians of Abruzzo
1958 births
1980 deaths
Italian neo-fascists
Third Position